Ya krasivaya was a Kazakh reality television show competition of non-professional aspiring models broadcast on Hit TV for a contract with the international model agency. The series is a version of Tyra Banks-created 2003 American reality television series America's Next Top Model. Its first cycle premiered and finished in 2005. 20 girls competed with only 17 of them moving into the model house. After several weeks Saule Zhunusova made a voluntary exit of the show because she felt homesick and bullied by the other contestants. In a live show final the top four battled it out for the win with Altyn Bekanova triumphing over Zhanna Saryeva in the super final. Many of the show's alumni went on to represent Kazakhstan in several beauty pageants afterwards. For now there are no further plans to continue the show.

Cycles

References

Kazakhstani television series
2000s Kazakhstani television series debuts
2000s Kazakhstani television series endings
2000s reality television series